Granulina isseli is a species of very small sea snail, a marine gastropod mollusk or micromollusk in the family Granulinidae.

Distribution
This species occurs in the Red Sea off Egypt.

References

 Savigny, J-.C., 1817 Description de l'Egypte, ou recueil des observations et des recherches qui ont été faites en Egypte pendant l'expédition de l'Armée française, publié par les ordres de sa Majesté l'Empereur Napoléon le Grand. Histoire Naturelle, p. 339 pp
 Issel, A., 1869 Malacologia del mar rosso. Ricerche zoologiche e paleontologiche, p. 387 pp, pls 1-5
 Nevill, G & Nevill, H., 1875. Descriptions of new marine Mollusca from the Indian Ocean. Journal of the Asiatic Society of Bengal 44(2): 83-104
 Savigny, J-.C., 1817 Description de l'Egypte, ou recueil des observations et des recherches qui ont été faites en Egypte pendant l'expédition de l'Armée française, publié par les ordres de sa Majesté l'Empereur Napoléon le Grand. Histoire Naturelle, p. 339 pp
Xenophora Taxonomy 16: 9-24

Granulinidae
Gastropods described in 1875